Velká Bíteš (until 1924 Velká Byteš) is a town in Žďár nad Sázavou District in the Vysočina Region of the Czech Republic. It has about 5,200 inhabitants. The historic town centre is well preserved and is protected by law as an urban monument zone.

Administrative parts
Villages of Bezděkov, Březka, Holubí Zhoř, Jáchymov, Janovice, Jestřabí, Jindřichov, Košíkov, Ludvíkov and Pánov are administrative parts of Velká Bíteš. Pánov forms an exclave of the municipal territory.

Geography
It lies in the Křižanov Highlands, on the small river Bítýška.

History

The first written mention of Velká Bíteš is from 1240, when the church was mentioned. The settlement was founded in the first half of the 13th century. In the mid-14th century, it was a market town and in 1408, it was promoted to a town.

The greatest development occurred after the Hussite Wars, but the town was severely damaged during the Thirty Years' War and recovered slowly. Velká Bíteš was not industrialized until 1950, when a large engineering company was founded. Thanks to this, the population increased significantly.

Demographics

Economy

The largest employers based in the town are ITW PRONOVIA, manufacturer of plastic products for the automotive industry, and První Brněnská Strojírna Velká Bíteš, manufacturer of aerospace technologies.

Transport
Velká Bíteš is located by the D1 motorway.

Sights
Velká Bíteš is known for the unique fortified Church of Sain John the Baptist. The original wooden structure was replaced by a stone Romanesque church in the 13th century. In the 15th century, it was surrounded by stone ramparts with an entrance tower.

Notable people
Martin Roháč (?–1571), serial killer
Vojtěch Řepa (born 2000), cyclist

Twin towns – sister cities

Velká Bíteš is twinned with:
 Hanušovce nad Topľou, Slovakia
 Torrevecchia Pia, Italy

References

External links

Cities and towns in the Czech Republic
Populated places in Žďár nad Sázavou District